Netsilik is a territorial electoral district (riding) for the Legislative Assembly of Nunavut, Canada.

The riding consists of the communities of Taloyoak and Kugaaruk. The district was created prior to the 28 October 2013 general election. The communities were previously in Nattilik and Akulliq.

Jeannie Ugyuk was chosen as the Family Services Minister in the 4th Nunavut Legislature. On 7 November 2015, a leadership review of the cabinet was held and as a result of a non-confidence vote a motion was made to remove Ugyuk from cabinet. On 9 November, prior to discussion on the motion, Ugyuk resigned both from cabinet and as MLA and the motion was withdrawn. A by-election was held in February 2016.

Election result

2013 election

2016 by-election

2017 election

References

Electoral districts of Kitikmeot Region
2013 establishments in Nunavut